Lanterne is a French word designating a lantern or lamp post. The word, or the slogan "À la lanterne!" (in English: To the Lamp Post!) gained special meaning and status in Paris and France during the early phase of the French Revolution, from the summer of 1789. Lamp posts served as an instrument to mobs to perform extemporised lynchings and executions in the streets of Paris during the revolution when the people of Paris occasionally hanged officials and aristocrats from the lamp posts. The English equivalent would be "String Them Up!" (British) or "Hang 'Em High!"(American)

La Lanterne became a symbol of popular or street justice in revolutionary France. The slogan "À la lanterne!" is referred to in such emblematic songs as Ça Ira ("les aristocrates à la lanterne!" means "aristocrats to the lamp-post!" in this context). Journalist Camille Desmoulins, who had earlier practiced law, designated himself "The Lantern Attorney." He wrote a pamphlet entitled (in translation) "The Lamp Post Speaks to Parisians," in which "la lantèrne" tells the people, "I've always been here. You could have been using me all along!".  As the revolutionary government became established, lamp posts were no longer needed as execution instruments, being replaced by the guillotine which became infamous in Paris during 1793–1794, though all major French cities had their own.

Hanging people from lamp posts ceased to be a part of Paris rebellions in the 19th Century.  Though the tradition continued in symbolic form up to the twentieth and twenty-first centuries, via the ritual hanging in effigy of unpopular political figures during street protests.

History 

The first prominent victim of lynching "à la lanterne" was Joseph Foullon de Doué, an unpopular politician who replaced Jacques Necker as a Controller-General of Finances in 1789. On 22 July 1789, the mob attempted to hang him on a lamp post, however, after the rope broke, he was beheaded and radicals marched with his head on a pike through the streets. "If [the people] are hungry, let them eat grass," he is said to have once proclaimed, although the claim is unsubstantiated. Because Foulon, an aristocrat administrator of the royal government, was in charge of the Paris markets. Foulon was known for his coldheartedness towards the needs of the common French people; he was suspected of controlling Paris' food supply and, thereby, keeping food prices unaffordable.  So hated that he had even staged his own funeral to escape the people's wrath, the 74-year-old Foulon had spent years growing rich at his post while the poor starved.  On 22 July 1789, he was captured by an angry Paris crowd, who stuffed Foulon's mouth with grass, then summarily hanged him from the boom of a lamp post at the Place de Grève, in front of the town hall (L'Hôtel de Ville). But the rope broke, and Foulon was hanged again and again before he was dropped to the ground and decapitated.  His head, its mouth still full of grass, was placed on a pike—a long, sharpened, wooden pole—and paraded through the streets. Later that day Foulon's son-in-law, Louis Bénigne François Bertier de Sauvigny, was taken to the Place de Grève and hanged there, from the lamp post. De Sauvigny's severed head was placed on a pike of its own.  Those bearing the pikes put the two severed heads together and chanted, "Kiss Daddy!" 

Immediately following the storming of the Bastille on 14 July 1789 two of the invalids (veteran soldiers) forming part of the garrison of the fortress were hanged in the Place de Grève, although it is not recorded whether lanternes were used for the purpose.

Particularly the lamp post standing at the corner of the Place de Grève and the Rue de la Vannerie served as an improvised gallows. The reason for that was partly symbolic: the lantern was placed opposite the Hôtel de Ville (Paris City Hall), directly under the bust of Louis XIV, so that "popular justice could take place right under the eyes of the king".

In August 1789, journalist and politician Camille Desmoulins wrote his Discours de la lanterne aux Parisiens, a defense of lynchings in the streets of Paris. Desmoulins was nicknamed Procureur-général de la lanterne (Attorney-General of the Lamp-post).

On 21 October 1789, a hungry Parisian mob dragged François the Baker (Denis François) out of his shop and hanged him from a lamp post, apparently because he had no bread to sell. Street lynching, instigated by various factors, gradually became an effective tool for the ends of the Jacobins.

On 14 December 1790, the crowd hanged barrister Pascalis and chevalier de La Rochette from a lamp post in Aix-en-Provence. The advocates of street justice cried "À la lanterne! À la lanterne!" shortly before the lynching.

On 20 June 1792, a mob broke into the Tuileries and threatened the queen Marie Antoinette. Her lady-in-waiting Jeanne-Louise-Henriette Campan reported that in the crowd "there was a model gallows, to which a dirty doll was suspended bearing the words "Marie-Antoinette a la lanterne" to represent her hanging".

Influences 
In 1919, Max Pechstein, a German expressionist painter, created a poster for the magazine An die Lanterne (À la lanterne). The poster depicts, among other things, a man hanging from a rope on a lamp post.

References

Further reading 
 Arasse, Daniel: La Guillotine et l’imaginaire de la Terreur, Paris, Flammarion, 1987. 
 Bertaud, Jean-Paul: La Presse et le pouvoir de Louis XIII à Napoléon Ier, Paris, Perrin, 2000. 
 Gueniffey, Patrice: La Politique de la terreur. Essai sur la violence révolutionnaire, 1789-1939, Paris, Fayard, 2000. 
 Kennedy, Emmet: A Cultural History of the French Revolution, New Haven, CT, Yale University Press, 1989
 Rogers, Corwell B.: The Spirit of Revolution in 1789: A Study of Public Opinion as Revealed in Political Songs and Other Popular Literature at the Beginning of the French Revolution. Princeton, NJ, Princeton University Press, 1949

External links 
 
 

French Revolution
Lynching
Execution sites in France